Pleuroptyx is an extinct genus of prehistoric amphibian known from the Late Carboniferous (Pennsylvanian) of Ohio. The type species is Pleuroptyx clavatus.

See also
 Prehistoric amphibian
 List of prehistoric amphibians

References

Lysorophians